H, or h, is the eighth letter in the Latin alphabet, used in the modern English alphabet, the alphabets of other western European languages and others worldwide. Its name in English is aitch (pronounced , plural aitches), or regionally haitch .

History

The original Semitic letter Heth most likely represented the voiceless pharyngeal fricative. The form of the letter probably stood for a fence or posts.

The Greek Eta 'Η' in archaic Greek alphabets, before coming  to represent a long vowel, still represented a similar sound, the voiceless glottal fricative . In this context, the letter eta is also known as Heta to underline this fact. Thus, in the Old Italic alphabets, the letter Heta of the Euboean alphabet was adopted with its original sound value .

'H' is also used in many spelling systems in digraphs and trigraphs, such as 'ch', which represents  in Spanish, Galician, and Old Portuguese;  in French and modern Portuguese;  in Italian and French.

Name in English
The pronunciation  and the associated spelling "haitch" is often considered to be h-adding and is considered non-standard in England. It is, however, a feature of Hiberno-English, and occurs sporadically in various other dialects.

The perceived name of the letter affects the choice of indefinite article before initialisms beginning with H: for example "an H-bomb" or "a H-bomb". The pronunciation  may be a hypercorrection formed by analogy with the names of the other letters of the alphabet, most of which include the sound they represent.

The haitch pronunciation of h has spread in England, being used by approximately 24% of English people born since 1982, and polls continue to show this pronunciation becoming more common among younger native speakers.

Authorities disagree about the history of the letter's name. The American Heritage Dictionary of the English Language derives it from French hache from Latin haca or hic. Anatoly Liberman suggests a conflation of two obsolete orderings of the alphabet, one with H immediately followed by K and the other without any K: reciting the former's ..., H, K, L,... as  when reinterpreted for the latter ..., H, L,... would imply a pronunciation  for H.

Use in writing systems

English
The letter is silent in a syllable rime, as in ah, ohm, dahlia, cheetah, pooh-poohed, as well as in certain other words (mostly of French origin) such as hour, honest, herb (in American but not British English) and vehicle (in certain varieties of English). Initial  is often not pronounced in the weak form of some function words including had, has, have, he, her, him, his, and in some varieties of English (including most regional dialects of England and Wales) it is often omitted in all words (see ''-dropping). That is, when the phoneme /h/ precedes a vowel, /h/ may be realized as a voiceless version of the subsequent vowel. For example the word , /hɪt/ is realized as [ɪ̥ɪt]. H is the eighth most frequently used letter in the English language (after S, N, I, O, A, T, and E), with a frequency of about 4.2% in words. When h is placed after certain other consonants, it modifies their pronunciation in various ways, e.g. for ch, gh, ph, sh, and th.

Other languages
In the German language, the name of the letter is pronounced . Following a vowel, it often silently indicates that the vowel is long: In the word  ('heighten'), the second  is mute for most speakers outside of Switzerland.

The spelling reflects an earlier pronunciation of the sound .

In French, the name of the letter is written as "ache" and pronounced . The French orthography classifies words that begin with this letter in two ways, one of which can affect the pronunciation, even though it is a silent letter either way. The H muet, or "mute" , is considered as though the letter were not there at all, so for example the singular definite article le or la, which is elided to l''' before a vowel, elides before an H muet followed by a vowel. For example, le + hébergement becomes l'hébergement ('the accommodation'). For example in le homard ('the lobster') the article le remains unelided, and may be separated from the noun with a bit of a glottal stop.

In Italian,  has no phonological value. Its most important uses are in the digraphs 'ch'  and 'gh' , as well as to differentiate the spellings of certain short words that are homophones, for example some present tense forms of the verb avere ('to have') (such as hanno, 'they have', vs. anno, 'year'), and in short interjections (oh, ehi).

Some languages, including Czech, Slovak, Hungarian, Finnish, and Estonian use  as a breathy voiced glottal fricative , often as an allophone of otherwise voiceless  in a voiced environment.

In Hungarian, the letter has no fewer than five pronunciations, with three additional uses as a productive and non-productive element of digraphs. The letter h may represent /h/ as in the name of the Székely town Hargita; intervocalically it represents /ɦ/ as in tehén; it represents /x/ in the word doh; it represents /ç/ in ihlet; and it is silent in cseh. As part of a digraph, it represents, in archaic spelling, /t͡ʃ/ with the letter c as in the name Széchenyi; it represents, again, with the letter c, /x/ in pech (which is pronounced [pɛxː]); in certain environments it breaks palatalization of a consonant, as in the name Beöthy which is pronounced [bøːti] (without the intervening h, the name Beöty could be pronounced [bøːc]); and finally, it acts as a silent component of a digraph, as in the name Vargha, pronounced [vɒrgɒ].

In Irish,  is not considered an independent letter, except for a very few non-native words, however  placed after a consonant is known as a "séimhiú" and indicates lenition of that consonant;  began to replace the original form of a séimhiú, a dot placed above the consonant, after the introduction of typewriters.

In most dialects of Polish, both  and the digraph  always represent .

In Basque, during the 20th century it was not used in the orthography of the Basque dialects in Spain but it marked an aspiration in the North-Eastern dialects. During the standardization of Basque in the 1970s, the compromise was reached that h would be accepted if it were the first consonant in a syllable. Hence, herri ("people") and etorri ("to come") were accepted instead of erri (Biscayan) and ethorri'' (Souletin). Speakers could pronounce the h or not. For the dialects lacking the aspiration, this meant a complication added to the standardized spelling.

Other systems
As a phonetic symbol in the International Phonetic Alphabet (IPA), it is used mainly for the so-called aspirations (fricative or trills), and variations of the plain letter are used to represent two sounds: the lowercase form  represents the voiceless glottal fricative, and the small capital form  represents the voiceless epiglottal fricative (or trill). With a bar, minuscule  is used for a voiceless pharyngeal fricative. Specific to the IPA, a hooked  is used for a voiced glottal fricative, and a superscript  is used to represent aspiration.

Related characters

Descendants and related characters in the Latin alphabet
H with diacritics: Ĥ ĥ Ȟ ȟ Ħ ħ Ḩ ḩ Ⱨ ⱨ ẖ ẖ Ḥ ḥ Ḣ ḣ Ḧ ḧ Ḫ ḫ ꞕ Ꜧ ꜧ
IPA-specific symbols related to H:       
Superscript IPA symbols related to H: 𐞖 𐞕
ꟸ: Modifier letter capital H with stroke is used in VoQS to represent faucalized voice.
ᴴ : Modifier letter H is used in the Uralic Phonetic Alphabet
ₕ : Subscript small h was used in the Uralic Phonetic Alphabet prior to its formal standardization in 1902
ʰ : Modifier letter small h is used in Indo-European studies
ʮ and ʯ : Turned H with fishhook and turned H with fishhook and tail are used in Sino-Tibetanist linguistics
Ƕ ƕ : Latin letter hwair, derived from a ligature of the digraph hv, and used to transliterate the Gothic letter 𐍈 (which represented the sound [hʷ])
Ⱶ ⱶ : Claudian letters
Ꟶ ꟶ : Reversed half h used in Roman inscriptions from the Roman provinces of Gaul

Ancestors, siblings, and descendants in other alphabets
𐤇 : Semitic letter Heth, from which the following symbols derive
Η η : Greek letter Eta, from which the following symbols derive
𐌇 : Old Italic H, the ancestor of modern Latin H
 : Runic letter haglaz, which is probably a descendant of Old Italic H
Һ һ : Cyrillic letter Shha, which derives from Latin H
И и : Cyrillic letter И, which derives from the Greek letter Eta
 : Gothic letter haal
Armenian letter ho (Հ)

Derived signs, symbols, and abbreviations
 : Planck constant
ℏ : reduced Planck constant
 : Blackboard bold capital H used in quaternion notation

Computing codes

1 and all encodings based on ASCII, including the DOS, Windows, ISO-8859, and Macintosh families of encodings.

Other representations

See also
 American Sign Language grammar
 List of Egyptian hieroglyphs#H

References

External links

 Lubliner, Coby. 2008. "The Story of H." (essay on origins and uses of the letter "h")

ISO basic Latin letters